Megachile holosericea is a species of bee in the family Megachilidae. It was described by Johan Christian Fabricius in 1793.

References

Holosericea
Insects described in 1793